Ali Salah Hashim (born February 16, 1987) is an Iraqi football striker who last played for Naft Maysan.

Honours

International
Iraq
 Arab Nations Cup Bronze medallist: 2012

Individual
 Jordan League second top-goalscorer: 2007–08
 Jordan League Best Foreign player: 2007–08
 Iraqi Premier League top-goalscorer: 2013–14

External links
 
 
 

1987 births
Living people
Iraqi footballers
Iraq international footballers
Iraqi expatriate footballers
Expatriate footballers in Syria
Al Wahda FC players
Al-Wahda SC (Syria) players
Al-Wehdat SC players
Al-Faisaly SC players
Expatriate footballers in Jordan
Al-Shorta SC players
UAE Pro League players
Association football forwards
Expatriate footballers in Lebanon
Syrian Premier League players
Safa SC players
Lebanese Premier League players
Iraqi expatriate sportspeople in Lebanon